In the field of biochemistry, PDPK1 refers to the protein 3-phosphoinositide-dependent protein kinase-1, an enzyme which is encoded by the PDPK1 gene in humans. It is implicated in the development and progression of melanomas.

Function 

PDPK1 is a master kinase, which is crucial for the activation of AKT/PKB and many other AGC kinases including PKC, S6K, SGK. An important role for PDPK1 is in the signalling pathways activated by several growth factors and hormones including insulin signaling.

Mice lacking PDPK1 die during early embryonic development, indicating that this enzyme is critical for transmitting the growth-promoting signals necessary for normal mammalian development.

Mice that are deficient in PDPK1 have a ≈40% decrease in body mass, mild glucose intolerance, and are resistant to cancer brought about by hyperactivation of the PI3K pathway (PTEN+/-).

Plant PDK1 plays an important role in regulating PIN-mediated auxin transport, and is thus involved in various developmental processes, such as embryonic development, lateral root formation, vasculature patterning, apical hook formation, gravitropism and phototropism.

Etymology 

PDPK1 stands for 3-phosphoinositide-dependent protein kinase 1. PDPK1 functions downstream of PI3K through PDPK1's interaction with membrane phospholipids including phosphatidylinositols, phosphatidylinositol (3,4)-bisphosphate and phosphatidylinositol (3,4,5)-trisphosphate. PI3K indirectly regulates PDPK1 by phosphorylating phosphatidylinositols which in turn generates phosphatidylinositol (3,4)-bisphosphate and phosphatidylinositol (3,4,5)-trisphosphate. However, PDPK1 is believed to be constitutively active and does not always require phosphatidylinositols for its activities.

Phosphatidylinositols are only required for the activation at the membrane of some substrates including AKT. PDPK1 however does not require membrane lipid binding for the efficient phosphorylation of most of its substrates in the cytosol (not at the cell membrane).

Structure 

The structure of PDPK1 can be divided into two domains; the kinase or catalytic domain and the PH domain. The PH domain functions mainly in the interaction of PDPK1 with phosphatidylinositol (3,4)-bisphosphate and phosphatidylinositol (3,4,5)-trisphosphate which is important in localization and activation of some of membrane associated PDPK1's substrates including AKT.

The kinase domain has three ligand binding sites; the substrate binding site, the ATP binding site, and the docking site (also known as PIF pocket). Several PDPK1 substrates including S6K and Protein kinase C, require the binding at this docking site. Small molecule allosteric activators of PDPK1 were shown to selectively inhibit activation of substrates that require docking site interaction. These compounds do not bind to the active site and allow PDPK1 to activate other substrates that do not require docking site interaction. PDPK1 is constitutively active and at present, there is no known inhibitor proteins for PDPK1.

The activation of PDPK1's main effector, AKT, is believed to require a proper orientation of the kinase and PH domains of PDPK1 and AKT at the membrane.

Interactions 

Phosphoinositide-dependent kinase-1 has been shown to interact with:

 AKT1,
 PKN2, 
 PRKACA, 
 PRKCD, 
 PRKCI, 
 Protein kinase Mζ, 
 Protein kinase N1, 
 SGK, 
 SLC9A3R2,  and
 YWHAH

References

Further reading

External links 
 

Protein kinases
EC 2.7.11